Harry David Robinson (born 26 September 2000) is a Northern Irish footballer currently playing as a midfielder for Clyde. Robinson has previously played for Motherwell, Glenavon, Oldham Athletic and also Crusaders and Queen of the South with loan spells.

Club career
Robinson started his career with Ridgeway Rovers. After playing for Glenavon, he signed for Oldham Athletic in 2017.

In August 2019, he joined NIFL Premiership club Crusaders on loan until January 2020. He was released by Oldham in January 2020.

On 9 March 2020, Robinson signed for Motherwell on a short-term contract for the remainder of the 2019–20 season, having spent time training with the club and playing for their reserve side.

On 18 September 2020, Robinson was sent out on a season-long loan to Dumfries club Queen of the South. On 2 February 2021, his loan spell at the Doonhamers was ended due to a persistent injury, as he returned to Fir Park earlier than planned.

In 2021, he joined Clyde on a 1-year contract.

International career
Robinson has played for Northern Ireland at under-15, under-16, under-18 and under-19 level.

Personal life
His father is St Mirren manager Stephen Robinson.

Career statistics

Club

Notes

References

2000 births
Living people
Association footballers from Northern Ireland
Northern Ireland youth international footballers
English footballers
English people of Northern Ireland descent
Association football midfielders
NIFL Premiership players
Glenavon F.C. players
Oldham Athletic A.F.C. players
Irish expatriate sportspeople in England
Expatriate footballers in England
English Football League players
Crusaders F.C. players
Motherwell F.C. players
Queen of the South F.C. players
Scottish Professional Football League players